The Graduate School of East Carolina University consist of 69 master's degree, 41 certificate, and 18 doctoral programs. It coordinates the graduate offerings of all departments in the seven colleges and two schools. The School also runs the non-professional degree programs of the professional School of Medicine.

East Carolina University divisions